Volume One is a 30-minute American television anthology series produced, written, and hosted by Wyllis Cooper.  It was a short-lived series that featured mystery and suspense stories.  Six episodes aired on the American Broadcasting Company's WJZ-TV Channel 7 in New York City in 1949. Each episode was numbered: "Volume One, Number One", "Volume One, Number Two" "Volume One, Number Three", etc.

References

External links
Volume One (TV series at CVTA with list of episodes

1940s American anthology television series
1949 American television series debuts
1949 American television series endings
American Broadcasting Company original programming